Telfair State Prison is a Georgia Department of Corrections state prison for men located on 210 Long Bridge Road, Helena, Telfair County, Georgia, United States.  The facility opened in 1992 and currently has a capacity of 1420 prisoners.  

Between August and October 2012, two inmates and a corrections officer named Larry Stell were fatally stabbed in the facility.  Telfair was awarded Facility of the Year by Georgia Department of Corrections Commissioner Brian Owens in 2014. 

Telfair State was one of 7 prisons whose inmates participated in the 2010 Georgia prison strike.

Notable inmates 
 Wayne Williams, believed by police to be responsible for at least 23 of the 30 Atlanta murders of 1979–1981
 Aeman Presley, serial killer responsible for four murders.

References

Prisons in Georgia (U.S. state)
Buildings and structures in Telfair County, Georgia
1992 establishments in Georgia (U.S. state)